Albert Tam (born 1972 in Hong Kong) is a Chinese-language Hong Kong science fiction writer who graduated from University of London and earned his MBA from University of Bradford. His notable works across genres earn him many awards in Hong Kong, Taiwan, and Mainland China.  He is best known for Humanoid Software series, which earned him the best saga novel of the 1st Xingyun (Nebula) Awards in China in 2010.  He is living in Hong Kong.

His story debut is Illusion and Reality which won third prize in Sun Ya Literature award for Youth Adults and Children. He won first prize with Sunset People next Year. His Broken Pieces got a special recommendation by Professor Chang Shi-kuo in Youth Literary Science Fiction Award in 1993. His Free City Anxiety Disorders was shortlisted in Ni Kuang Science Fiction Award in 2007.  His novels were also shortlisted for Comic Ritz Million Novel Award and BenQ Award.  He has also obtained sponsorship from Taipei Literature Award.

His other notable novel includes Melody of the Night, which shortlisted in the Chiu Ko 30th anniversary Two-Million Novel Award (2008).  Raster Murder Case was shortlisted in the best saga novel of the 6th Xingyun (nebula) Awards in China in 2015.

The Cat Whisperer is a fantasy series based on the history and culture of Tainan and was chosen by Taiwan Culture Ministry as one of the annual recommended titles of XMediaMatch From Book to Screen in 2018.

He is one of the featured writers of Hong Kong book fair in 2019.

Humanoid Software
"Humanoid Software is a widely acclaimed science fiction written by the Hong Kong writer Albert Tam in 2010. The story reflects the haunting belief that human being in one day will be subservient to technology. Within a limited amount of hours of imitating its master's behavior, the humanoid software will be able to perform the tasks programmed by its master through automatic technology. As the story unfolds, one day the software suddenly realizes that his master became the victim of a homicide in a series of social chaos, which includes terrorist attacks, invasion of highly secured networks by hackers etc. The theme of Software humanoid resonates closely with many award-winning science fictions, for instance Neuromancer, Snow Crash, Accelerando." By Uganda Sze Pui Kwan.

References

External links
Official website

Living people
1972 births
Hong Kong writers
Alumni of the University of Bradford